Boise House, near Harrodsburg, Kentucky, was built in 1817.  It was listed on the National Register of Historic Places in 1989.

It is a one-and-a-half-story brick residence, with brick laid in Flemish bond.  It includes Federal architecture.

References

National Register of Historic Places in Mercer County, Kentucky
Federal architecture in Kentucky
Houses completed in 1817
Houses in Mercer County, Kentucky
1817 establishments in Kentucky